Big Star Small World is a 2006 tribute album to the American power pop band, Big Star. It was produced by Big Star drummer Jody Stephens, who also created the cover art.

It was originally due for release in 1998 on Ignition Records, with contributions solicited from various artists starting in 1997. However, after the label went under, the project was shelved. It was eventually released in 2006 on Koch Records. A vinyl edition was released in 2018 for Record Store Day Black Friday on eOne.

Track listing
"Back of a Car" – Gin Blossoms  2:43
"Nighttime" – The Afghan Whigs  4:47
"The Ballad of El Goodo" – Matthew Sweet  4:18
"Don't Lie to Me" – Juliana Hatfield  3:05
"You Get What You Deserve" – Idle Wilds  3:06
"Give Me Another Chance" – Whiskeytown  4:14
"When My Baby's Beside Me" – Kelly Willis  3:02
"Jesus Christ" – Teenage Fanclub  2:53
"What's Going Ahn" – The Posies  3:22
"Thirteen" – Wilco  3:25
"Hot Thing" – Big Star  4:12

References

2006 compilation albums
Big Star tribute albums
MNRK Music Group compilation albums
Record Store Day releases